United Steel Workers of Montreal (or USWM) were a six-piece alternative country ensemble based in downtown Montreal, Quebec.  The band members included Gern F (vocals/acoustic guitar), Felicity Hamer (vocals/accordion), Sean "Gus" Beauchamp (vocals/acoustic guitar), Matt Watson (electric guitar), Flipper Frumignac (bass) and Dylan Perron (banjo/mandolin). The band draws on punk rock, bluegrass and country influences, and is part of a "citygrass" scene of alternative country musicians in Montreal.

History

The band began as an informal busking collective, playing every Tuesday in Montreal's Lucien-L'Allier metro station. After about seven or eight months, they booked a rehearsal space and began to actively record and perform as a permanent band. Their debut album Broken Trucks and Bottles was released in April 2005 and featured Sean Moore on banjo, mandolin and guitar. Shortly after the album's release Moore left the band and was replaced by Kevin McNeilly, while session man Roger Dawson also became a member.

The new lineup followed with Kerosene and Coal in 2007. That same year, a Montreal Mirror readers' poll voted them the third best act in the city, behind only Arcade Fire and electronic duo Team Canada. In 2007 Dawson left the band and was replaced by bass player Eddie Blake.

They have toured extensively across Canada and the United States, and Europe including performances at 2007 Canada Music Week and shows at the 2008 SXSW and Ottawa Bluesfest. Their music has also been playlisted on CBC Radio 3. Between tours the group continued performing in Montreal. They disbanded at the end of 2011.

Discography 
2005 Broken Trucks and Bottles
2007 Kerosene and Coal
2009 Three on the Tree

References

Musical groups established in 2004
Musical groups disestablished in 2011
Musical groups from Montreal
Canadian alternative country groups
English-language musical groups from Quebec
Canadian buskers
2004 establishments in Quebec
2011 disestablishments in Quebec